WaveDivision Holdings, LLC, doing business as Wave Broadband, is an American provider of residential, business, and enterprise class cable TV, broadband Internet, and telephone services to around 455,000 customers in Washington, Oregon, and California. Wave provides services via their own fiber-optic network and has approximately 1,300+ employees.

The company was founded by its former CEO, Steve Weed, in 2003, by purchasing cable systems owned by Northland Communications, Cedar Communications, and Charter Communications in Washington and Oregon. It was expanded by acquiring other, some distressed, cable, telecommunications, and broadband companies.

On May 22, 2017, it was announced that Wave was to be acquired by TPG Capital for $2.36 billion. Wave Broadband was combined with RCN Grande, two other cable/internet companies controlled by TPG Capital. RCN provides services along the East Coast and in Chicago similar to those of Wave; Grande operates throughout Texas. Wave is expected to continue to operate under its own brand after the merger is complete. The acquisition of Wave by TPG was completed on January 24, 2018. In November 2020, Stonepeak Infrastructure Partners announced that it would acquire Astound Broadband, which operates Wave, from TPG for $3.6 billion in a leveraged buyout that included an additional $4.5 billion of debt.

References

External links
 

Cable television companies of the United States
Companies based in Kirkland, Washington
Internet service providers of the United States
Telecommunications companies established in 2003
2003 establishments in Washington (state)
2018 mergers and acquisitions